All the Way may refer to:

Film and television
 All the Way, an Australian film of 1998 directed by Marque Owen
 All the Way (2001 film), a film directed by Shi Runjiu
 All the Way (film), a 2016 adaptation of Robert Schenkkan's play (see below)
 All the Way (TV series), a 1988 Australian television series
 "All the Way" (Buffy the Vampire Slayer), a television episode

Literature
 All the Way (play), a 2012 play about President Lyndon B. Johnson by Robert Schenkkan
 All the Way, a novel by Andy Behrens, basis for the film Sex Drive

Music

Albums
 All the Way (Allstar Weekend album) or the title song, 2011
 All the Way (Brenda Lee album), 1961
 All the Way (Calloway album) or the title song, 1989
 All the Way (Diamanda Galás album), 2017
 All the Way (Etta James album), 2006
 All the Way (Etta Jones album), 1999
 All the Way (Frank Sinatra album) or the title song (see below), 1961
 All the Way (Growing album), 2008
 All the Way... A Decade of Song, by Céline Dion, 1999
 All the Way... A Decade of Song & Video, a video release by Céline Dion, 2001
 All the Way... and Then Some!, by Sammy Davis Jr., 1958
 All the Way, by Jimmy Scott, 1992

Songs
 "All the Way" (Craig David song), 2005
 "All the Way" (Eddie Vedder song), 2008
 "All the Way" (Frank Sinatra song), 1957, covered by many
 "All the Way" (Jason McCoy song), 1996
 "All the Way" (Timeflies song), 2014
 "All the Way", by !!! from As If
 "All the Way", by Blasted Mechanism
 "All the Way", by Busted from Busted
 "All the Way", by Jacksepticeye and The Gregory Brothers
 "All the Way", by Jeremih and Chance the Rapper from Merry Christmas Lil' Mama
 "All the Way", by Journey from Arrival
 "All the Way", by Kiss from Hotter Than Hell
 "All the Way", by Matt Brouwer from Where's Our Revolution
 "All the Way", by Mikuni Shimokawa
 "All the Way", by New Order from Technique
 "All the Way", by The Professionals from The Professionals
 "All the Way", by the Ramones from End of the Century
 "All the Way", by Ratt from Ratt
 "All the Way", by Reykon, the theme song for Univision's coverage of the 2015 CONCACAF Gold Cup
 "All the Way...", by Ladytron from Witching Hour
 "All the Way (Stay)", by Jimmy Eat World from Surviving

See also
 "All the Ways", a 2019 song by Meghan Trainor, 2019
All the Way Live, a 2000 compilation album by Trouble Funk
"All the Way Live", a song by The Go! Team from Semicircle
 Go All the Way (disambiguation)
 Let's Go All the Way (disambiguation)